Opened in 1891, the Seilbahn Lauterbrunnen–Grütschalp was a 1.4km long funicular railway between Lauterbrunnen and Grütschalp in the Bernese Oberland, Switzerland. From Grütschalp, the Lauterbrunnen–Mürren mountain railway continues to Mürren. The line had a difference of elevation of 674m at an incline of 41-60%. The longest viaduct on the line was 220m. The funicular closed on 23 April 2006, and was replaced by a aerial cablecar in December 2006.

Water-counterbalanced line (1891 - 1902)
From line's opening in 1891 until 1902, the line was water powered. The downward car on each trip would be filled with 7m³ of water, sourced from the Staubbach, which counterbalanced the weight of the upward car. During this period, the track had three rails except at the upper station where there were four.

The rope, manufactured by Felten & Guillaume, had a diameter of 32.6mm and consisted of 125 wires of 26.3mm diameter externally and 72 wires of 1.3mm diameter internally. It had a breaking strength of 62,000kg and a weight of 3.5kg/m. By 1892 it had run approximately 5000km and stretched by 15m in length.

Electrified line (1902 - 2006)
In 1902, Swiss Locomotive and Machine Works and Joh. Jakob Rieter electrified the line and replaced the cars and cable. A power plant was built at Staubbach, 1.35km from the upper station. The new cars had 6 compartments for 62 passengers including 54 seats, floor set to be horizontal at 52% incline, 2 axles and total weight of 7950 kg.

In 1949, the Riggenbach rack was removed and the track changed from 3 to 2 rails.

The rope, also manufactured by Felten & Guillaume, had a diameter of 33.6mm and consisted of 6 stands of 16 wires each (7 wires 1.85mm in diameter, and 9 of 2.65mm diameter) around a fiber core. It had a breaking strength of 63,000kg and a weight of 3.75kg/m.

Gallery

Notes

References 

Lauterbrunnen-Grutschalp
Lauterbrunnen-Grutschalp
Bernese Oberland
Former water-powered funicular railways converted to electricity
Transport in the canton of Bern
Railway lines opened in 1891
Railway lines closed in 2016